The 2017 NCAA National Collegiate Volleyball Tournament was the 48th edition of the NCAA Men's National Collegiate Volleyball Championship, open to teams from both Division I and II. The tournament was held May 2, 4, & 6 at St. John Arena in Columbus, Ohio, hosted by Ohio State University. The Ohio State Buckeyes won their second consecutive National Championship and third overall.

Qualification
The champions of Conference Carolinas, the Eastern Intercollegiate Volleyball Association, Midwestern Intercollegiate Volleyball Association, and Mountain Pacific Sports Federation received automatic bids to the tournament, while two other teams were selected at large.

Automatic bids
Barton Bulldogs: Conference Carolinas
Penn State Nittany Lions: Eastern Intercollegiate Volleyball Association
Ohio State Buckeyes: Midwestern Intercollegiate Volleyball Association
Long Beach State 49ers: Mountain Pacific Sports Federation
At large bids
BYU: Mountain Pacific Sports Federation
Hawaii Rainbow Warriors: Mountain Pacific Sports Federation

Tournament bracket

All-Tournament Team 
Christy Blough – Ohio State
Driss Guessous – Ohio State
Maxime Hervoir – Ohio State
Blake Leeson – Ohio State
Brendan Sander – BYU
Nicolas Szerszen – Ohio State (Most Outstanding Player)
Stjin van Tilburg – Hawaii

Broadcasts
TWCS Hawaii carried the Hawaii first round match. The semifinals were streamed on NCAA.com and the championship match was broadcast on ESPN2.

Hawaii/Penn State: Kanoa Leahey & Chris McLachlin
Semifinals: Ralph Bednarcyzk
Championship: Paul Sunderland & Kevin Barnett

See also 
 NCAA Men's Volleyball Championships (Divisions I & II, Division III)
 NCAA Women's Volleyball Championships (Division I, Division II, Division III)

References

2017
NCAA Men's Volleyball Championship
NCAA Men's Volleyball Championship
2017 in sports in Ohio
2017 NCAA Division I & II men's volleyball season
Volleyball in Ohio